Đorđe Simeunović (born 26 April 1995) is a Serbian professional basketball player for Leyma Básquet Coruña of the Spanish LEB Oro.

Professional career
In February 2021, Simeunović signed for the Bosnian team Borac Banja Luka. In August 2022, he signed for Leyma Básquet Coruña of the Spanish LEB Oro.

References

External links 
 Profile at aba-liga.com
 Profile at eurobasket.com
 Profile at beobasket.net

1995 births
Living people
ABA League players
Basketball League of Serbia players
Básquet Coruña players
KK Mega Basket players
KK FMP players
OKK Beograd players
OKK Borac players
KK Vršac players
KK Smederevo players
KK Igokea players
KK Napredak Aleksinac players
Rouen Métropole Basket players
Serbian expatriate basketball people in Bosnia and Herzegovina
Serbian expatriate basketball people in France
Serbian expatriate basketball people in Spain
Serbian men's basketball players
Sportspeople from Kruševac
Small forwards
Shooting guards